Daron Jon Kirkreit (born August 7, 1972) is an American former baseball pitcher who played internationally for the United States national baseball team in the 1992 Summer Olympics, and played professionally in the minor leagues from 1993 to 2001.

Biography
A native of Anaheim, California, Kirkreit played college baseball for the University of California, Riverside. Originally cut from Team USA in 1992, he was playing collegiate summer baseball for the Cotuit Kettleers of the Cape Cod Baseball League when he was recalled to the Olympic team.

Kirkreit was drafted in the first round, the 11th pick, of the 1993 Major League Baseball (MLB) Draft by the Cleveland Indians. He played in the Indians, Milwaukee Brewers, Kansas City Royals, Seattle Mariners, and the Anaheim Angels minor league systems until his retirement after the 2001 season.

References

External links

1972 births
Baseball players at the 1992 Summer Olympics
Olympic baseball players of the United States
Living people
Watertown Indians players
Kinston Indians players
Canton-Akron Indians players
Buffalo Bisons (minor league) players
Akron Aeros players
Wichita Wranglers players
El Paso Diablos players
Nashua Pride players
Lancaster JetHawks players
New Haven Ravens players
Arkansas Travelers players
Long Beach Breakers players
Cotuit Kettleers players
Baseball players from Anaheim, California